Tototek is a Hong Kong-based company that develops video game accessories, with a big focus on older consoles. Among their products are flash cartridges for the Sega Master System, PC Engine, Mega Drive and SNES. They have converters which make it possible to use PlayStation joypads on other systems. Also available are backup units, which make it possible to transfer cartridge data onto computers. 

Some products :

Master System to MarkIII Converter
SUPER-FLASH 64M kit for SNES
MD-PRO 32M for Mega Drive
SMS-PRO 32M for Master System
Classic Joypad converter for 3DO
GG-PRO 32M flash cart for Game Gear
PCE-PRO 32M flash cart for TG-16/PC Engine
Classic Joypad converter for NEO-GEO
Mega Cart

They also manufactured Beggar Prince.

External links
 Official Site

Electronics companies of Hong Kong
Video game companies of China